Neal Kenyon (December 6, 1929 – December 19, 2008) was an American theatre director, choreographer, and actor.

Born in Hammond, Indiana, Kenyon graduated from Louisiana State University with a degree in theatre. He began his career working in television, and then made his off-Broadway stage debut in 1958 in The Boy Friend.

He directed and choreographed both off-Broadway and Broadway shows in the 1970s. He then began a teaching career, at Florida State University (FSU) in Sarasota, Florida from 1976 to 1981, and then at FSU in Tallahassee.

Kenyon received the Drama Desk Award for directing the off-Broadway musical Dames at Sea.

References

http://broadwayworld.com/bwidb/people/Neal_Kenyon/

External links
Neal Kenyon at the Internet off-Broadway Database

American theatre directors
American choreographers
Drama Desk Award winners
Florida State University faculty
1929 births
2008 deaths